Mikael Jantunen (born 20 April 2000) is a Finnish professional basketball player for Treviso Basket of the Lega Basket Serie A (LBA). He played college basketball for the Utah Utes.

Early life and career
Jantunen grew up in Helsinki and initially played football before switching to basketball at the age of 11. He competed for HBA-Märsky from 2016 to 2019, while attending the Helsinki Basketball Academy. In October 2018, Jantunen committed to Utah over offers from Loyola Marymount, Oregon State, Georgia Tech, and Stanford.

College career
Jantunen started three games as a freshman and averaged 6.7 points and 4.9 rebounds per game. He suffered a fractured nose in December 2020, forcing him to wear a protective mask. On 9 January 2021, Jantunen scored a career-high 20 points in a 79–73 loss to Oregon. As a sophomore, Jantunen averaged 8.9 points, 4.5 rebounds, and 1.5 assists per game. Following the season, he opted to turn professional.

Professional career

Oostende (2021–2022) 
On 23 July 2021, Jantunen signed with Filou Oostende of the BNXT League and the Basketball Champions League. He won the BNXT League Sixth Man of the Year award, as well as the Belgian championship with Oostende.

Treviso (2022–present) 
On 14 June 2022, Jantunen was announced by Italian club Treviso Basket of the Lega Basket Serie A (LBA).

National team career
Jantunen represented Finland in the 2018 FIBA U18 European Championship. He averaged 17 points, 10 rebounds and 3.6 assists per game, shooting 72.3 percent from the field. Jantunen played several games for the Finnish senior national team in the FIBA EuroBasket 2022 Qualifier round. He was forced to miss time with Utah in February 2021 to play in the matches.

Career statistics

College

|-
| style="text-align:left;"| 2019–20
| style="text-align:left;"| Utah
| 31 || 3 || 23.2 || .661 || .313 || .733 || 4.9 || 1.1 || .4 || .3 || 6.7
|-
| style="text-align:left;"| 2020–21
| style="text-align:left;"| Utah
| 20 || 20 || 28.1 || .600 || .370 || .857 || 4.5 || 1.5 || .7 || .1 || 8.9
|- class="sortbottom"
| style="text-align:center;" colspan="2"| Career
| 51 || 23 || 25.1 || .631 || .349 || .779 || 4.7 || 1.2 || .5 || .2 || 7.6

References

External links
Utah Utes bio

2000 births
Living people
BC Oostende players
Finnish expatriate basketball people in the United States
Finnish expatriate sportspeople in Belgium
Finnish men's basketball players
Power forwards (basketball)
Sportspeople from Helsinki
Universo Treviso Basket players
Utah Utes men's basketball players